Stary Lubotyń  is a village in Ostrów Mazowiecka County, Masovian Voivodeship, in east-central Poland. It is the seat of the gmina (administrative district) called Gmina Stary Lubotyń.

References

Villages in Ostrów Mazowiecka County
Łomża Governorate
Białystok Voivodeship (1919–1939)
Warsaw Voivodeship (1919–1939)
Belastok Region